Omar Alieu Touray (born 5 November 1965) is a Gambian diplomat. He was the Gambia's Permanent Representative to the United Nations from 2007 to 2008 and has been Secretary of State for Foreign Affairs since March 2008.

Touray received his B.A. (literature and linguistics) from Ain Shams University in 1987 and graduated with a Ph.D. in international relations at the Graduate Institute of International Studies in Geneva in 1994.

He was liaison officer for the World Indigenous Organization at the United Nations Office at Geneva from September 1993 to December 1994. He was then a consultant at the International Labour Office in Geneva until July 1995, at which point he briefly became Senior Assistant Secretary at the Gambian  Ministry of External Affairs before becoming First Secretary of the Gambian Embassy to Belgium, and Permanent Mission to the European Union and the World Trade Organization later in 1995. In mid-1996 he was moved to the post of Counsellor and Head of Chancery at the same embassy, and he remained in that post until April 2002.

From April 2002 to September 2007, Touray was the Gambian Ambassador to Ethiopia, with additional accreditation as Permanent Representative to the African Union, the United Nations Economic Commission for Africa, and the United Nations Environment Programme, as well as High Commissioner to South Africa and Kenya. He was appointed as Gambia's Permanent Representative to the United Nations in September 2007 before being appointed as Secretary of State for Foreign Affairs on March 19, 2008, replacing Crispin Grey-Johnson. Touray was sworn in as Secretary of State on March 26. After his sacking in September 2009, he was employed by the Islamic Development Bank in Saudi Arabia and the Ivory Coast.

In October 2021, Omar Touray, was unanimously appointed as the new president of the ECOWAS Commission for the period 2022–2026.

References

1965 births
Living people
Ain Shams University alumni
Graduate Institute of International and Development Studies alumni
Permanent Representatives of the Gambia to the United Nations
Government ministers of the Gambia
Permanent Representatives of the Gambia to the African Union
Ambassadors of the Gambia to Belgium
Ambassadors of the Gambia to the Netherlands
Ambassadors of the Gambia to Germany
Ambassadors of the Gambia to Italy
Ambassadors of the Gambia to Luxembourg
Ambassadors of the Gambia to the Czech Republic
Ambassadors of the Gambia to Poland
Ambassadors of the Gambia to Slovakia
Ambassadors of the Gambia to the European Union
Ambassadors of the Gambia to Ethiopia
High Commissioners of the Gambia to South Africa
High Commissioners of the Gambia to Kenya